Goodbye & Hello is the sixth Mandarin-language studio album by singer-songwriter Tanya Chua, released on October 19, 2008 by AsiaMuse Entertainment. After receiving her first Best Female Mandarin Singer award at the 17th Golden Melody Awards in 2006, Chua felt lost regarding her music career. The album was released after ending her 8-month online relationship, mentioning that "inspiration comes after a few setbacks and wounds".

At the 19th Golden Melody Awards, the album earned her the Best Female Mandarin Singer for the second time along with the Best Producer award out of seven nominations, the most ever received by a female artist.

Track listing

Awards and nominations

References

2007 albums
Tanya Chua albums